Mylestom is a small town in New South Wales, Australia, located on the coast near the mouth of the Bellinger River.

It has a surf lifesaving club, a caravan park, a hotel, and shops. North Beach Recreation and Bowling Club, Chans Top Chinese Restaurant, Surfside Pizza, Mylestom Coffee Shop and Post Office. Annual Putt Bennett Fishing Festival (2ND Weekend Jan each Year).
Over 9klms of pristine beach. Bellinger River, Two Boat Ramps and Swimming in Riverside Tidal Pool, Alma Doepel Park and Childrens Playground.
There is a Disabled access pathway from the Beach down past Alama Doepel Park, right along the picturesque Bellinger River, crossing over at Christian Parade and with access to the BMX Track and Skatepark. The Pathway continues on down to the Recreation and Bowling Club.

References

Mid North Coast
Towns in New South Wales
Coastal towns in New South Wales
Bellingen Shire